Anthony House or Anthony Farm may refer to:

in the United States (by state then town)
David Rinehart Anthony House, Eutaw, Alabama
Anthony House (Little Rock, Arkansas), a former hotel
Horace Anthony House, Camache, Iowa
Anthony House (Adams, Massachusetts)
David M. Anthony House (Fall River, Massachusetts)
David M. Anthony House (Swansea, Massachusetts)
Harold H. Anthony House, Swansea, Massachusetts
Anthony-Corwin Farm, Long Valley, New Jersey
Susan B. Anthony Childhood House, Battenville, New York
Susan B. Anthony House, Rochester, New York, a U.S. National Historic Landmark
Abraham Anthony Farm, Blackburn, North Carolina
Herman Anthony Farm, Canby, Oregon, listed on the NRHP in Clackamas County
John Anthony House, La Grande, Oregon
Anthony-Buckley House, La Grande, Oregon

See also
Levi Anthony Building, Cape Vincent, New York